Frederick George Heriot (11 January 1786 – 30 December 1843) was a British army officer, who fought in the War of 1812 and subsequently became a landowner and administrator in Canada.

Biography

Of mixed Scottish and Irish ancestry, he was born in the Channel Islands, the son of an army surgeon. He entered the army in 1801 as Ensign in the 49th Regiment of Foot (whose commanding officer was the then Lieutenant Colonel Isaac Brock). Heriot went with the 49th to Canada the following year, and served there for the remainder of his military career.

When war broke out with the United States, he was appointed second in command of the Canadian Voltigeurs with the acting rank of Major. He commanded a detachment of Voltigeurs at Kingston, Ontario during 1813 and was present at the Battle of Sackett's Harbor and the Battle of Crysler's Farm, where he played a prominent part.

The following year, he became acting commanding officer of the Voltigeurs, and remained in this post until the end of the war.

After the war, he resigned from the army and instead became the Administrator for the settlement of discharged soldiers in the valley of the Saint-François River in Lower Canada, which would become Drummondville, Quebec. Heriot was named a Companion in the Order of the Bath in 1822. He was elected Member of the Legislative Assembly for the community in 1829 and 1830 and served as a member of the Special Council that governed Lower Canada after the Lower Canada Rebellion. He was also a Major General in the militia.

External links
 

1786 births
1843 deaths
49th Regiment of Foot officers
British Army personnel of the War of 1812
Canadian people of the War of 1812
Canadian people of Channel Islands descent
Canadian people of Irish descent
Canadian people of Scottish descent
Companions of the Order of the Bath
Drummondville
Members of the Legislative Assembly of Lower Canada
Members of the Special Council of Lower Canada
Immigrants to Lower Canada
British emigrants to pre-Confederation Quebec